Reeve Stewart "Rip" McKay (November 26, 1881 – January 18, 1946) was a Major League Baseball pitcher who played in one game for the St. Louis Browns on October 2, .

External links

1881 births
1946 deaths
St. Louis Browns players
Major League Baseball pitchers
Baseball players from Texas
Fort Worth Panthers players
Paris Parasites players
Waco Steers players
Milwaukee Brewers (minor league) players
Waco Tigers players
Des Moines Underwriters players
Des Moines Champs players
Lincoln Ducklings players
Lincoln Treeplanters players
Sioux City Packers players
Houston Buffaloes players